"Rock Bottom" is the second segment of the 17th episode of the first season of the American animated television series SpongeBob SquarePants. It first aired on Nickelodeon in the United States on March 15, 2000. In the episode, SpongeBob gets stranded in an abyssopelagic zone that is a city called Rock Bottom.

The episode was written by Paul Tibbitt, Ennio Torresan, and David Fain, and the animation was directed by Tom Yasumi. Upon release, "Rock Bottom" was viewed by two million households and received positive reviews from critics.

Plot summary
SpongeBob and Patrick board a bus to go home from Glove World, a glove-themed amusement park. They accidentally board the wrong bus, which then takes them down a 90-degree cliff. The cliff leads to an abyssopelagic zone called Rock Bottom, which is inhabited by many strange deep-sea animals. Patrick becomes frightened of Rock Bottom, so SpongeBob leaves him at the bus stop while he goes to get a bus schedule. As soon as SpongeBob leaves, the next bus to Bikini Bottom arrives, with Patrick leaving SpongeBob behind. Unable to climb the 90-degree cliff, SpongeBob decides to wait for the next bus.

After a number of mishaps prevent him from boarding a bus, SpongeBob heads to a bus station and waits in a very long line. By the time he reaches the front, he finds out that the next bus leaves in 5 seconds; he misses it and learns that it was the last one until morning. As the lights go out for the night, SpongeBob hears a resident of Rock Bottom and dashes back to the cliff in terror. The resident is revealed to be a friendly-looking anglerfish creature, who has retrieved SpongeBob's Glove balloon. The creature blows up the balloon and ties it to SpongeBob's wrist, which allows him to rise up the cliff. Believing that SpongeBob is still stuck in Rock Bottom, Patrick boards a bus and heads down the cliff to fetch him. SpongeBob spots him on the way out, but decides to leave Patrick on his own as to not get stuck again.

Production
"Rock Bottom" was written by Paul Tibbitt, Ennio Torresan, and David Fain, with Tom Yasumi serving as animation director. Tibbitt and Torresan also worked as storyboard directors. The episode originally aired on Nickelodeon in the United States on March 15, 2000, with a TV-Y7 parental rating.

Series head writer of the first season Merriwether Williams said the episode's story is "so simple." She remarked "To me, it's one of the best episodes. It just stayed with one idea." The episode was about "how he [SpongeBob] keeps missing the bus and how that makes him feel." Williams said the episode was "so small that you could explore gags and opportunities for gags." The episode was an example of "a good outline" in the series where the storyboards and humor were done easily. Williams said "it was great for the board guys." She added "In many ways, my job was to create situations where the board guys could be funny, to create a situation that could be funny, and let them go for the actual, specific jokes."

"Rock Bottom" was released on the DVD compilation called The Best of SpongeBob SquarePants on May 11, 2004. It was also included on the SpongeBob SquarePants: The Complete 1st Season DVD, released on October 28, 2003. On September 22, 2009, the episode was released on the SpongeBob SquarePants: The First 100 Episodes DVD, alongside all the episodes of seasons one through five.

Reception
"Rock Bottom" was watched by 2.1 million viewers upon its release. It received very positive reviews from media critics. Nancy Basile of About.com gave the episode a positive response and ranked it  4 on her "Best SpongeBob SquarePants Episodes" list. Basile said "The raspberries and SpongeBob's increasing frustration make this a hilarious episode." She cited the episode as a "running up against Murphy's law over and over again" and said "so it's very relatable." Basile's favorite scene was "SpongeBob tries to extract a snack from the vending machine before the bus across the road drives away."

Emily Estep of WeGotThisCovered.com ranked the episode  5 on her "Top 10 Episodes of SpongeBob SquarePants" list. She said "While 'Rock Bottom' is mostly a goofy episode, it's also one of the scarier episodes of SpongeBob." She also said the episode has "the ideal balance of cuteness and sheer terror – like SpongeBob running from a mysterious character, saying, 'Well, that place will be there tomorrow. I guess I'd better keep walking. Running. Better start running. Running. Sprinting! Yes, I just gotta keep sprinting!' (Before he hits a wall; 'Sitting, sitting, bleeding.')" that made the episode "so well-remembered." Bill Treadway of DVD Talk gave the episode a 3 out of 5 rating.

In 2021, Jordan Moreau, Katcy Stephan and David Viramontes of Variety ranked the episode  14 on their 15 best SpongeBob episodes list. They noted how the episode flips the usual dynamics of SpongeBob annoying people around him by putting SpongeBob in a setting weirder than him.

Other media

"Rock Bottom" served as an inspiration for the SpongeBob SquarePants Rock Bottom Plunge ride. The ride first opened on March 15, 2008, at the Mall of America's Nickelodeon theme park re-branded from the Mall of America's Park at MOA, formerly Camp Snoopy, to Nickelodeon Universe in the Minneapolis-St. Paul suburb of Bloomington, Minnesota.

The SpongeBob SquarePants Rock Bottom Plunge features vertical lifts and 90-degree turns providing the riders a 60-plus foot drop, a maximum speed of over 40 miles per hour and a 4.4 maximum G-force rating. The ride time is approximately two minutes and is the shortest Gerstlauer roller coaster built yet.

References

External links

2000 American television episodes
SpongeBob SquarePants episodes
Film and television memes